Love Affair(s) is a 2020 French drama film written and directed by Emmanuel Mouret. The film stars Camelia Jordana, Niels Schneider, Vincent Macaigne and Julia Piaton.

The film received 13 nominations for the 46th César Awards, the most nominations of any eligible film.

Plot summary

Cast
 Camelia Jordana as Daphné
 Niels Schneider as Maxime
 Vincent Macaigne as François
 Émilie Dequenne as Louise
 Jenna Thiam as Sandra
 Guillaume Gouix as Gaspard
 Julia Piaton as Victoire
 Louis-Do de Lencquesaing as The director

Reception

Box office
The film was released in France on September 16, 2020 in 294 theaters, with 11,144 admissions on its first day.

The first weekend in theaters brings together 55,695 admissions. After a week, the film has accumulated 77,092 admissions. Despite 66 additional screens, the second weekend was marked by a 24.5% drop in admissions with 58,182 additional spectators.

In January 2021, 279,094 admissions were recorded.

Release
The film was released on September 16, 2020 in France.

References

External links
 
 

French drama films
2020s French films